Fundacomez is a Venezuelan community television channel.  It was created in September 2004 and can be seen in the Machiques de Perija Municipality of the Zulia State of Venezuela on UHF channel 69.  David Palmar is the legal representative of the foundation that owns this channel.

Fundacomez does not have a website.

See also
List of Venezuelan television channels

Television networks in Venezuela
Television stations in Venezuela
Mass media in Venezuela